Karl Ernst Smidt (30 August 1903 – 11 January 1984) was German naval commander who reached the rank of Konteradmiral with the West German Navy. He served during World War II and was a recipient of the Knight's Cross of the Iron Cross of Nazi Germany. From 1961 to 1963 he was the NATO Commander-in-Chief of the German Fleet of the North Sea and the Baltic Sea.

Early life and pre-war service
Smidt was born in Neuenhaus, district of Grafschaft Bentheim, in the Province of Hanover on 30 August 1903, the son of pastor Reinhard Petrus Wolbertus Smidt. He began his naval career with the Reichsmarine on 31 March 1922 as a member "Crew 1922" (the incoming class of 1922) after graduation from the humanistische Gymnasium (humanities-oriented secondary school) in Hameln with his Abitur (diploma). Smidt married Ruth Kühl in 1930. The marriage produced two daughters and a son, Antje, Hilke, and Wolbert Klaus, former First Director with the Federal Intelligence Service. Smidt joined the Confessing Church with pastor Hermann Steen in Holthusen, district of Weener, after making an official visit to the Emsland concentration camp Esterwegen near Papenburg in 1935.

Awards
 Wehrmacht Long Service Award 4th and 3rd Class (2 October 1936)
 Spanish Cross in Bronze with Swords (6 June 1939)
 Iron Cross (1939)  2nd Class (6 November 1939) & 1st Class (8 December 1939)
 Officer of the Order of the Crown of Italy (11 March 1941)
 German Cross in Gold on 20 November 1941 as Korvettenkapitän on Z27/8. Zerstörer-Flottille
 Knight's Cross of the Iron Cross on 15 June 1943 as Kapitän zur See and commander of Z27
 Commander Cross of the Order of Merit of the Federal Republic of Germany (14 August 1963)

Notes

References

Citations

Bibliography

 
 
 
 
 

1903 births
1984 deaths
Reichsmarine personnel
Kriegsmarine personnel
German military personnel of the Spanish Civil War
Bundesmarine admirals
Recipients of the Gold German Cross
Recipients of the Knight's Cross of the Iron Cross
Commanders Crosses of the Order of Merit of the Federal Republic of Germany
People from Bentheim
People from the Rhine Province
Counter admirals of the German Navy
Military personnel from Lower Saxony